The Grand Alliance (GA) was a political multi-party electoral alliance in the Philippines that existed from 1959 to 1965. It was composed of members of the Progressive Party and defectors from the Nacionalista Party and the Liberal Party.

History

Formation
In 1959, the Liberal Party, led by Vice-President Diosdado Macapagal and Senate President Ferdinand Marcos, negotiated with members of the Progressive Party for a possible alliance with the two parties. Under the terms of the negotiation, Manuel Manahan and Raul Manglapus would be included in the senatorial slate of the Liberal Party for the 1959 senatorial elections. According to Macapagal, Manahan initially agreed to the coalition.

However, the Progressive camp wanted Senator Emmanuel Pelaez and former Defense Secretary Jesus Vargas. This eventually found the support of Senator Ambrosio Padilla from the Liberal Party. Due to a disagreement with the terms, the proposed coalition broke down. According to Manglapus, this also resulted in Padilla being ousted from the Liberal Party.

With negotiations with the Liberal Party failing to move forward, the Progressive Party and defectors of both the Nacionalista Party and Liberal Party formed the Grand Alliance (GA).

1959 election
The GA put up its own six-man slate for the 1959 senatorial elections. Manahan, Manglapus, and Vargas represented the Progressive wing of the alliance. Pelaez represented the Nacionalista wing, while Narciso Pimentel, Jr. and Osmundo Mondoñedo represented the Liberal wing.

By the end of the election, none of them were successful in acquiring a Senate seat.

Members
The following had served as members of the Grand Alliance:
Vicente Araneta
Rogelio de la Rosa
Manuel Manahan
Raul Manglapus
Osmundo Mondoñedo
Ambrosio Padilla
Emmanuel Pelaez
Rodrigo Perez
Narciso Pimentel, Jr.
Francisco Soc Rodrigo
Jesus Vargas

References

Defunct political party alliances in the Philippines
Political parties established in 1959
Political parties disestablished in 1965